Yasumoto (kanji:  or ) is a Japanese surname. Notable people with the surname include:

, Japanese voice actor
, Japanese photographer
, Japanese photographer

Japanese-language surnames